Mary Maude is a British film and television actress.

Selected filmography
 The House That Screamed (1970) - Irene
 Granny Gets the Point (1971) - Sandra
 Crucible of Terror (1971) - Millie
 Man at the Top (1971) - Robin Ackerman
 La muerte incierta (1973) - Brenda
 Scorpio (1973) - Anne
 Double Exposure (1977) - Nicki
 The Four Feathers (1978 TV movie) - Mrs. Feversham
 Terror (1978) - Lady Garrick

Television appearances
 At Last The 1948 Show (1967) - Lady in bath
 The Freewheelers (1968 to 1973) - Terry Driver
 Special Branch (1973) - Clare
 Lovejoy (1991) - Annabel
 Bread (1991) - Lady Bowford (final television appearance)

References

External links
 

Living people
British film actresses
British television actresses
Year of birth missing (living people)